Cư M'gar is a rural commune of Cư M'gar District, Đắk Lắk Province, Vietnam.

References

Communes of Đắk Lắk province
Populated places in Đắk Lắk province